The Bible: An American Translation (AAT) is an English version of the Bible consisting of the Old Testament translated by a group of scholars under the editorship of John Merlin Powis Smith, the Apocrypha translated by Edgar J. Goodspeed, and the New Testament translated by Edgar J. Goodspeed.

In a foreword to the 1949 edition, Goodspeed wrote, "The rapid advance of learning in recent years in the fields of history, archaeology, and language has thrown new light upon every part of the Bible. At the same time our changing English speech has carried us farther and farther from the sixteenth-century diction in which all our standard versions of it are clothed. Yet the great messages of the Old and New Testaments were never more necessary than in our present confused and hurried life. We have, therefore, sought to produce a new translation of them, based upon the assured results of modern study, and put in the familiar language of today."

See also 
 List of English Bible translations

1935 non-fiction books
American Translation
American Translation

External links 
The Old Testament An American Translation by J. M. Powis
The New Testament, An American Translation by Edgar J. Goodspeed